Anwar Bensabouh (born 21 January 1999) is a Dutch professional footballer who plays for Telstar.

Club career
Bensabouh made his Eerste Divisie debut for Almere City on 20 August 2018 in a game against Jong AZ, as an 86th-minute substitute for Anass Ahannach.

On 30 June 2021, Bensabouh signed a two-year contract with league rivals SC Telstar.

Personal life
Born in the Netherlands, Bensabouh is of Moroccan descent.

References

External links
 

1999 births
Living people
Footballers from Amsterdam
Dutch footballers
Dutch sportspeople of Moroccan descent
Association football forwards
Almere City FC players
SC Telstar players
Eerste Divisie players
Tweede Divisie players
Derde Divisie players